Cego is a very small unincorporated community in west Falls County, Texas, United States. Cego is located on Farm-to-market road 1950. As of 2000, the population was 42.

References

External links 
Cego, Texas at the Handbook of Texas Online

Unincorporated communities in Falls County, Texas
Unincorporated communities in Texas